Cuise-la-Motte is a commune in the Oise department in northern France It has a thriving L'Arche community, which was founded in the nearby town of Trosly.

See also
 Communes of the Oise department

References

Communes of Oise